Puerto Rico Highway 201 (PR-201) is a road located in Vieques, Puerto Rico. This highway extends from its intersection with PR-200 in Florida and continues to the southwest, where it intersects with PR-996 (km 3.7), PR-995 (km 4.5) and again with PR-996 (km 6.9) in Puerto Real, and then continues west through Llave until km 8.9 at the ROTH radar installations.

Major intersections

See also

 List of highways numbered 201

References

External links
 

201
Vieques, Puerto Rico